Todor Mihalev (born 27 April 1997) is a Bulgarian modern pentathlete.

He participated at the 2018 World Modern Pentathlon Championships, winning a medal.

References

External links

Living people
1997 births
Bulgarian male modern pentathletes
World Modern Pentathlon Championships medalists